Malombra may refer to:

 Malombra (novel), an 1881 novel by the writer Antonio Fogazzaro 
 Malombra (1917 film), a silent Italian film directed by Carmine Gallone 
 Malombra (1942 film), an Italian film directed by Mario Soldati 
 Malombra (TV series), a 1974 Italian television series
 Malombra (1984 film), an Italian film directed by Bruno Gaburro 
 Pietro Malombra (1556-1618), Italian painter